Treadway is a surname. Notable people with the surname include:

Allen T. Treadway (1867–1947), American politician
Craig Treadway, American journalist and TV news anchor
Jeff Treadway (born 1963), Major League Baseball second baseman
Red Treadway (1920–1994), Major League Baseball outfielder
Rick Treadway (born 1970), American auto racer
Richard Treadway (1913-2006), American politician and businessman
Ty Treadway (born 1967), American actor

See also
Tredway, a surname